Ammar Ahmed Ghuloom Al Bannai is a Bahraini politician, journalist, and businessman of Iranian descent. He was sworn into the Council of Representatives on December 12, 2018, on behalf of the fourth district of the Capital Governorate.

Education
He has a journalism degree.

Career
He began his career as a television presenter and worked at the Information Affairs Authority, formerly the Ministry of Information. He later went into other parts of the private sector.

He was a member of the Board of Directors of the Bahrain Journalists Association, a member of the Bahraini-Omani Joint Business Council, and a member of the Bahrain Sports for All Federation.

House of Representatives
He entered politics in 2014, running for the House of Representatives for the fourth district of the Capital Governorate. He lost in the first round, earning 649 votes for 15.59%, a sixth- and last-place finish.

In 2018, however, he ran for the same district, earning 2,068 votes (48.05%) in the first round November 24. He defeated Abdul Rahman Bu Majeed, the incumbent deputy since 2006, with a final result of 2,490 votes for 66.31%.

References

Bahraini businesspeople
Bahraini journalists
Bahraini politicians
Bahraini people of Iranian descent
Bahraini Shia Muslims
Members of the Council of Representatives (Bahrain)
1973 births
Living people